Hennadiy Makarov (10 July 1939) is a former professional Soviet football midfielder and coach.

References

External links
 
 Oleksiy Hrachov. One has to correspond to Sevastopol! (Алексей Грачев. Севастополю надо соответствовать!). FC Sevastopol. (mentioning of Makarov)

1939 births
Living people
Sportspeople from Sevastopol
Soviet footballers
FC Iskra Smolensk players
Soviet football managers
Ukrainian football managers
FC Chayka Sevastopol managers
FC Iskra Smolensk managers
FC Naftovyk Okhtyrka managers
Association football midfielders